Corinne Humphreys (born 7 November 1991 in London) is an English sprinter. She competed in the 100 metres at the 2018 Commonwealth Games reaching the semifinals. In addition, she finished fourth at the 2017 Summer Universiade.

International competitions

Personal bests
Outdoor
100 metres – 11.39 (+1.2 m/s, Hérouville 2017)
200 metres – 24.03 (-1.0 m/s, Lee Valley 2017)

Indoor
60 metres – 7.38 (Newham 2016)

Personal life
She is openly gay.

References

1991 births
Living people
English female sprinters
British female sprinters
Athletes from London
Athletes (track and field) at the 2018 Commonwealth Games
Commonwealth Games competitors for England
Alumni of the University of East London
Competitors at the 2017 Summer Universiade
Lesbian sportswomen
English LGBT sportspeople
LGBT track and field athletes
21st-century LGBT people